Moacir Costa da Silva (born 14 February 1986 in Recife), simply known as Moacir, is a Brazilian footballer who plays for Vila Nova. Mainly a defensive midfielder, he can also play as a right back.

Club career
Moacir joined Central after being released by Sport's youth team. He turned professional with the team in 2006. In 2008 he played in Série C and Copa do Brasil with the club. He was spotted by Sport and resigned with the club in June 2008. Moacir retrained as a right-back whilst at Sport, and featured for them in the 2008 Copa do Brasil final and in the 2009 Copa Libertadores.

Moacir signed for Corinthians in 2010 in an arrangement which saw the transfer of all his rights to the club. He negotiated release from his contract in May 2011 and resigned for Sport Recife.

Released by Sport in 2013, Moacir signed for Paraná. Then in 2014 for Coritiba. He missed a large part of the season after a heart condition was discovered whilst on trial at Figueirense. In 2015, recovered, he was loaned to Boa Esporte. In April 2015 he signed for Fortaleza. He was released in May 2016 after seeing little game time with the club. A month later he signed for Luverdense.

In 2017 Moacir signed for Grêmio Novorizontino for the first half of the season, and then for a second spell at Luverdense to play in Série B in April. In 2018 he moved to Ferroviária and then moved to Vila Nova to play Série B in the second half of the season.

For 2019 Moacir signed for Atlético Goianiense.

Honours 
Sport
 Campeonato Pernambucano: 2009

Fortaleza
 Campeonato Cearense: 2016

Luverdense
 Copa Verde: 2017

References

External links

1986 births
Living people
Sportspeople from Recife
Brazilian footballers
Association football midfielders
Association football fullbacks
Campeonato Brasileiro Série A players
Campeonato Brasileiro Série B players
Campeonato Brasileiro Série C players
Central Sport Club players
Sport Club do Recife players
Sport Club Corinthians Paulista players
Paraná Clube players
Coritiba Foot Ball Club players
Boa Esporte Clube players
Fortaleza Esporte Clube players
Luverdense Esporte Clube players
Grêmio Novorizontino players
Associação Ferroviária de Esportes players
Vila Nova Futebol Clube players
Atlético Clube Goianiense players